James Clark was an African-American man who was lynched in Eau Gallie, Florida by ten white men in 1926.

History

On July 11, 1926, James Clark, a chauffeur for a traveling salesman, was accused of rape by a white girl. He was arrested, but the chief of police turned him over to a mob. A noose was placed around his neck, he was dragged over a tree limb, and shot with a shotgun. The street near the site of the lynching, around Parkway Drive and U.S. 1 in what is now Melbourne, Florida was named Lynching Tree Drive until 1980, when the black community petitioned the Melbourne City Council to change the name, which was then changed to Legendary Lane.

No attempt was made to determine who murdered Clark without the benefit of a trial. This is the last known lynching in Brevard County.

References

1926 deaths
Lynching deaths in Florida
Brevard County, Florida
Crimes in Florida
1926 murders in the United States
1926 in Florida
African-American history between emancipation and the civil rights movement
White American riots in the United States
Racially motivated violence against African Americans
History of racism in Florida
July 1926 events
African-American history of Florida
People murdered in Florida
Male murder victims
Prisoners murdered in custody
Anti-black racism in the United States
Deaths from fire in the United States
Murdered African-American people